Tickety Toc is a preschool interactive comedy computer-animated television series produced by The Foundation, part of Zodiak Media and FunnyFlux Entertainment. The first series consists of 52 episodes, each 11 minutes long, but is often shown as twenty-six blocks, each containing two episodes.

The first series was acquired by Nick Jr. as part of a global deal. The series premiered in Asia on 19 April 2012 and was subsequently rolled out internationally with localised dubs. Tickety Toc aired for the first time on British TV on 23 April 2012 and became the number 1 daytime show on Nick Jr. in the United States for the first three months when it launched 10 September 2012. In addition to the Nick Jr. global acquisition, the show has been sold to free-to-air television partners internationally. Launching on Channel 5's Milkshake slot 1 November 2012. Other broadcasters who have picked up the 52-episode series include TG4 in Ireland and Family Channel in Canada.

Jolly Roger or Amusement Rides LTD made a Pufferty kiddie ride, featuring the main characters Tommy and Tallulah. It features a mirror so you can see yourself on Pufferty, the Tickety Toc theme tune and four funny sound effects.

The show centres around the Tickety Toc Clock, which is located in the middle of a wall of clocks inside an old clock shop. The clock chimes the time every hour, but it's not as easy as it seems. Behind the clock's face is an extraordinary world where things don't always run smoothly. The show's main characters Tommy and Tallulah, who race against time to keep Tickety Toc Clock ticking and chiming the time. The siblings do everything with enthusiasm, commitment and positivity even if it gets them further into trouble. Among the characters who live in the clock's fantastical world are Pufferty, an anthropomorphic train and a dog hybrid that helps the citizens of Tickety Town get around, jaguar maintenance man McCoggins, rabbit Hopparoo, chef/baker cow Madame Au Lait, bat boss Battersby, green and orange chicken Chickadee, and gardener snail Lopsiloo. Throughout the episodes, an owl named Tooteroo tries to do a certain activity sometimes based on the episodes theme, but is always unlucky.

In the United States, Tickety Toc originally aired on Nickelodeon's preschool block Nick Jr., but was later burned off to the  Nick Jr. channel on weekdays. The series has a page on Paramount+, but no episodes have been added as of 2023.

Merchandise
Zodiak Rights, the Consumer Products Licensing division of the Zodiak Media Group, launched merchandise, including toys, books, games and clothing, internationally starting in fall 2013. Vivid Imaginations and Just Play were the master toy partners for Tickety Toc globally. International licensing agents represented Tickety Toc in the following countries:

United States – Established Brands
Canada – Studio Licensing
France – Zodiak Kids, Paris
Australia – Fusion
Benelux – J & M Brands

References

External links

2012 British television series debuts
2015 British television series endings
2010s British animated television series
2010s British children's television series
British children's animated comedy television series
2012 South Korean television series debuts
2015 South Korean television series endings
South Korean children's animated comedy television series
British computer-animated television series
English-language television shows
Channel 5 (British TV channel) original programming
Nick Jr. original programming
British preschool education television series
Animated television series about children
Animated preschool education television series
2010s preschool education television series
Television series by Banijay